This is a list of anarchist communities representing any society or portion thereof founded by anarchists that functions according to anarchist philosophy and principles. Anarchists have created and been involved in a plethora of community experiments since the 19th century. There are numerous instances in which a community organizes itself along philosophically anarchist lines to promote regional anarchist movements, counter-economics and countercultures. These have included intentional communities founded by anarchists as social experiments and community-oriented projects, such as collective organizations and cooperative businesses. There are also several instances of mass society "anarchies" that have come about from explicitly anarchist revolutions, including the Makhnovshchina in Ukraine, Revolutionary Catalonia in Spain and the Shinmin autonomous region in Manchuria.

Mass societies

Active societies

Past societies

Intentional communities 
Active communities:

 Jinwar (2018-present)

Past communities:

Community projects 
Active Projects

Past Projects

See also 

 Lists of ungoverned communities
 List of socialist states
 Communist state
 List of stateless societies
 Permanent autonomous zone – a community that is autonomous from the generally recognized government or authority structure
 Zomia – the ungoverned highlands of Southeast Asia, held as an analogous anarchist society by professor James C. Scott

References

Bibliography 
 
 
 </ref>

Further reading

External links 
 An Anarchist FAQ - Section I - What would an anarchist society look like?, hosted on Infoshop.org.
 An Anarchist FAQ - What are some examples of "Anarchy in Action"?, hosted on Infoshop.org.

 
Communities